Christopher Michael Spurling (born June 28, 1977) is an American former relief pitcher, most recently with the Milwaukee Brewers minor league system. His ties to Dayton include attending Sinclair Community College and graduating from Northridge High School.

With the return of Todd Jones to the Detroit Tigers' closer role in late April 2006, Spurling was sent down to their Triple-A affiliate, the Toledo Mud Hens of the International League.

Spurling, drafted by the New York Yankees in the 41st round of the 1997 amateur draft, has also been in the Pittsburgh Pirates and Atlanta Braves organizations.

On September 8, 2006, he was claimed off waivers from the Tigers by the Milwaukee Brewers. Spurling had a 2007 record of 2–1, with a 4.68 ERA, and 28 strikeouts. During spring training 2008, he was released by the Brewers.

References

External links

 MLB.com Player File

1977 births
Living people
Major League Baseball pitchers
Milwaukee Brewers players
Detroit Tigers players
Baseball players from Dayton, Ohio
Toledo Mud Hens players
Nashville Sounds players
Newark Bears players
Long Island Ducks players
Miami RedHawks baseball players
Gulf Coast Yankees players
Greensboro Bats players
Tampa Yankees players
Lynchburg Hillcats players
Altoona Curve players